The Singapore dollar (sign: S$; code: SGD) is the official currency of the Republic of Singapore. It is divided into 100 cents. It is normally abbreviated with the dollar sign $, or S$ to distinguish it from other dollar-denominated currencies. The Monetary Authority of Singapore (MAS) issues the banknotes and coins of the Singapore dollar.

As of 2019, the Singapore dollar is the 13th-most traded currency in the world by value. Apart from its use in Singapore, the Singapore dollar is also accepted as customary tender in Brunei according to the Currency Interchangeability Agreement between the Monetary Authority of Singapore and the Autoriti Monetari Brunei Darussalam (Monetary Authority of Brunei Darussalam). Likewise, the Brunei dollar is also customarily accepted in Singapore.

History

The Spanish-American silver dollar brought over by the Manila galleons was in wide circulation in Asia and the Americas from the 16th to 19th centuries. From 1845 to 1939 the Straits Settlements (of which Singapore used to be part) issued its local equivalent, the Straits dollar. This was replaced by the Malayan dollar, and, from 1953, the Malaya and British Borneo dollar, which were issued by the Board of Commissioners of Currency, Malaya and British Borneo.

Singapore continued to use the common currency upon joining Malaysia in 1963, but only two years after Singapore's expulsion and independence from Malaysia in 1965, the monetary union between Malaysia, Singapore and Brunei broke down.
Singapore established the Board of Commissioners of Currency, Singapore, on 7 April 1967 and issued its first coins and notes. Nevertheless, the Singapore dollar was exchangeable at par with the Malaysian ringgit until 1973, and interchangeability with the Brunei dollar is still maintained.

Initially, the Singapore dollar was pegged to the pound sterling at a rate of two shillings and four pence to the dollar, or £1 = S$60/7 or S$8.57; in turn, £1 = US$2.80 from 1949 to 1967 so that US$1 = S$3.06. This peg to sterling was broken in 1967 when the pound was devalued to US$2.40 but the peg to the U.S. dollar of US$1 = S$3.06 was retained. This peg remained for a short time after the Nixon Shock of the early 1970s. As Singapore's economy grew and its trade links diversified to many other countries and regions, Singapore moved towards pegging its currency against a fixed and undisclosed trade-weighted basket of currencies from 1973 to 1985.

Before 1970, the various monetary functions associated with a central bank were performed by several government departments and agencies. As Singapore progressed, the demands of an increasingly complex banking and monetary environment necessitated streamlining the functions to facilitate the development of a more dynamic and coherent policy on monetary matters. Therefore, the Parliament of Singapore passed the Monetary Authority of Singapore Act in 1970, leading to the formation of MAS on 1 January 1971. The MAS Act gave the MAS the authority to regulate all elements of monetary, banking, and financial aspects of Singapore.

From 1985 onwards, Singapore adopted a more market-oriented exchange regime, classified as a Monitoring Band, in which the Singapore dollar is allowed to float (within an undisclosed bandwidth of a central parity) but closely monitored by the Monetary Authority of Singapore (MAS) against a concealed basket of currencies of Singapore's major trading partners and competitors. This, in theory, allows the Singaporean government to have more control over imported inflation and to ensure that Singapore's exports remain competitive.

On 1 October 2002, the Board of Commissioners of Currency Singapore (BCCS) merged with the Monetary Authority of Singapore (MAS), which took over the responsibility of banknote issuance.

Currency in circulation
As of 2012, the total currency in circulation was S$57.278 billion. All issued Singapore currency in circulation (notes and coins) are fully backed by external assets in its Currency Fund to maintain public confidence.  Such external assets consists of all or any of the following: (a) gold and silver in any form; (b) foreign exchange in the form of demand or time deposits; bank balances and money at call; Treasury Bills; notes or coins; (c) securities of or guaranteed by foreign governments or international financial institutions; (d) equities; (e) corporate bonds; (f) currency and financial futures; (g) any other asset which the Authority, with the approval of the President of Singapore, considers suitable for inclusion.

In 2017, the government, in the second reading of the Monetary Authority of Singapore (Amendment) Bill 2017, announced that the Currency Fund will be merged with other funds of the MAS, because the currency in circulation is effectively backed by the full financial strength and assets of MAS, which is much larger than the Currency Fund. As at 31 March 2017, MAS's assets (S$395 billion) were more than seven times larger than the assets of the Currency Fund (S$55 billion). The proposed amendment will merge the Currency Fund with the other funds of MAS and streamline MAS's operations. The Government has said that its support for the currency in circulation, as set out in the Currency Act, remains unchanged.

Singapore's foreign reserves officially stood at over US$288.2 billion, as of July 2022 according to the MAS.

Coins
In 1967, the first series of coins was introduced in denominations of 1, 5, 10, 20 and 50 cents and 1 dollar. These coins depicted wildlife and other images relating to the island nation and were designed by Stuart Devlin, the same artist credited for the 1966 designs on Australia's decimal coin series. The sizes were the same as those used for the Malaysian ringgit and based directly on the old coinage of the former Malaya and British Borneo dollar. The 1-cent coin was bronze while the other denominations were copper-nickel. Later, in 1976, the 1-cent coin was changed to copper-clad steel. The production of the first series was phased out by 1985.

In 1985, the second series of coins were introduced in denominations of 1, 5, 10, 20 and 50 cents and 1 dollar. The reverse of these coins were designed by Christopher Ironside. The new series offered smaller coins depicting a floral theme. One-dollar banknotes were discontinued and gradually replaced with an aluminium-bronze coin. The 5-cent coin was also changed to aluminum-bronze while the 10, 20, and 50 cents remained copper-nickel. Limited numbers of commemorative bimetallic 5-dollar coins with scalloped edges were also periodically issued later during this series. This series is still in circulation. The 1 cent coin was taken out of circulation in 2004.

On 21 February 2013, the Monetary Authority of Singapore announced a new series of coins in denominations of 5, 10, 20, 50 cents and 1 dollar, which went into circulation on 25 June 2013, featuring Singapore's national icons and landmarks.
The coins are struck on a multi-ply plated-steel planchet used by the Royal Canadian Mint and comes with enhanced features to differentiate from fakes. The coins also feature new designs, the one-dollar, now a bi-metallic coin featuring the Merlion, the fifty cents coin featuring the Port of Singapore, the twenty-cent coin depicts Changi International Airport, the ten-cent coin featuring public housing and the five-cent coin featuring the Esplanade. The second and third series of Singaporean coins have medallic orientation.

Banknotes

Orchid series

The Orchid Series of currency notes is the earliest to be in for circulation in Singapore. Issued in the years 1967 to 1976, it has nine denominations: $1, $5, $10, $25, $50, $100, $500, $1,000, and $10,000.

Each note has an orchid design in the centre of the note's front, the orchid being the national flower of Singapore. A scene of Singapore is depicted on the back, which varies across denominations. Standard on each note, is the Coat of Arms, a lion head watermark, and the signature of the Minister for Finance and chairman of the board of Commissioners of Currency, Singapore, on the front of the note. As an added security feature, all notes have at least one vertically embedded security thread, while the $10,000 note has two.

Bird series

The Bird Series of currency notes is the second set of notes to be issued for circulation in Singapore. Issued in the years 1976 to 1984, it has nine denominations, the same number as in the Orchid Series, albeit the $25 note was replaced by the $20 note.

Each note features a bird on the left side of the note's front, a theme selected to represent a young Singapore "ever ready to take flight to greater heights". Standard on each note, is the Coat of Arms, a lion head watermark, and the signature of the Minister for Finance and chairman of the board of Commissioners of Currency, Singapore, on the front of the note. As an added security feature, all notes have a vertically embedded security thread, while the $1,000 and $10,000 notes have two.

Ship series

The Ship Series of currency notes is the third set of notes to be issued for circulation in Singapore. Issued in the years 1984 to 1999, it retains the number of denominations as was in the previous two series of notes, but switches the $20 note for the $2 one.

A maritime theme to reflect Singapore's maritime heritage was adopted, and progressively shows across the various denominations, the different kinds of ships which have plied Singapore's waters as the country developed. These vignettes are located on the front of the note. On the back, various scenes depicting Singapore's achievements are shown, as well as an orchid, to symbolise the country's national flower.

Standard on each note, is the Coat of Arms, a lion head watermark, and the signature of the Minister for Finance and chairman of the board of Commissioners of Currency, Singapore, on the front of the note. As an added security feature, all notes have a vertically embedded security thread.

Portrait series

The current Portrait series was introduced in 1999, with the one- and 500-dollar denominations omitted. These notes feature the face of Yusof bin Ishak, the first president of the Republic of Singapore, on the obverse, and the reverse depicts a feature of civic virtue. There are both paper and polymer notes in circulation. The designs of the polymer notes are very similar to the corresponding paper note except for the slightly slippery feel and a small transparent window design in the corner of the banknote. Polymer notes are progressively replacing the paper banknotes in circulation. The notes also have Braille patterns at the top right-hand corner of the front design.

The S$10,000 and B$10,000 note are the world's most valuable banknotes (that are officially in circulation). As of August 2011, it is worth over seven times as much as the next most valuable, the 1,000-Swiss franc note. On 2 July 2014, the Monetary Authority of Singapore announced that it would stop printing $10,000 notes starting from 1 October 2014 to reduce the risk of money laundering, with all banks instructed to exchange the notes with MAS and not recirculate them. This is a trend in many countries like European Central Bank's discontinuation of the 500-euro banknote in 2016 and AMBD's announcement to stop the production and issuance of the B$10,000 (the largest banknote) in 2020 amid the COVID-19 pandemic. MAS would also stop producing the S$1,000 banknote as well from 1 January 2021 onwards, but banks would be allowed to recirculate existing notes with customers. The MAS said that the higher denomination notes (beyond $100) will continue to remain legal tender.

Commemorative banknotes

Commemorative banknotes are also released, usually in limited quantities. The first commemorative banknote was released on 24 July 1990 to celebrate the 25th anniversary of Singapore's independence. Of the 5.1 million $50 polymer banknotes issued, 300,000 came with an overprint of the anniversary date "9 August 1990". This $50 note was the first commemorative note issued by the Board of Commissioners of Currency, Singapore (BCCS) and was also the first polymer banknote in the history of Singapore's currency. In addition, the $50 note was the first note designed in Singapore by a Singapore artist.

On 8 December 1999, to celebrate the coming 2000 millennium, three million $2 millennium notes were circulated. The note is similar to the $2 portrait series, except that the prefix of the serial number is replaced with a Millennium 2000 logo. These millennium notes are printed on paper as polymer notes were not introduced yet then.

On 27 June 2007, to commemorate 40 years of currency agreement with Brunei, a commemorative S$20 note was launched; the back is identical to the Bruneian $20 note launched simultaneously. A circulation version of the $20 note can be exchanged at banks in Singapore beginning 16 July 2007, limited to two pieces per transaction.

On 18 August 2015, to commemorate Singapore's 50 years of nation-building, the Monetary Authority of Singapore launched a set of six commemorative notes. These commemorative notes comprise five S$10 polymer notes and a S$50 note. The note design's draw inspiration from significant milestones and achievements in Singapore's history, the multiracialism that defines the nation and the values and aspirations that underpin Singapore's progress. The front of both the $50 and $10 notes feature a portrait of Yusof Ishak, Singapore's first president, as in the current Portrait series notes. The $50 note highlights Singapore's history, transformation and future. It shows the late Prime Minister of Singapore, Lee Kuan Yew, shouting "Merdeka!"—the rallying cry of Singapore's independence struggle. The note makes distinctive use of the colour gold, reflecting Singapore's Golden Jubilee. The five $10 notes have a common front design and varying back designs depicting the theme 'Vibrant Nation, Endearing Home'. Each note reflects a value or aspiration that defines the theme: 'Caring Community, Active Citizenry', 'Opportunities for All', 'Safe and Secure', 'Strong Families' and '...regardless of race, language or religion...'.

In 2017, to commemorate the 50th anniversary of its Currency Interchangeability Agreement between Brunei and Singapore, both the Monetary Authority of Brunei Darussalam and the Monetary Authority of Singapore issued $50 polymer banknotes to commemorate that event.

On 5 June 2019, a $20 note commemorating the Singapore Bicentennial was issued.

Exchange rates

Current exchange rates

Exchange rates charts

See also 
 Economy of Singapore

Notes

References

Citations

Sources

External links 

 Images of the four note series

Dollar
Currencies of Asia
Circulating currencies
Currencies of the Commonwealth of Nations
 
Currencies introduced in 1967
Fixed exchange rate